Pelochyta adumbrata is a moth of the family Erebidae. It was described by Paul Dognin in 1922. It is found in Bolivia.

References

Pelochyta
Moths described in 1922